The Jaipur Marathon is an annual international marathon held in Jaipur, India. The event happens each year on a Sunday in February and is one of the largest marathons in Asia. It is also the largest mass participation sporting event on the continent. It started in 2010.

History 
Mukesh Mishra, the director of the Indian Institute of Event Management Research and a fitness enthusiast, is the founder of Jaipur Marathon. The organisers of the event are Sanskriti Yuva Sanstha and World Trade Park , believed that Jaipur would be able to support such a road race in India. The first event was held in 2010.

Since it began, Jaipur Marathon has supported various events and marathon formats. It has been endorsed by socialites, international brand ambassadors, Bollywood celebrities, and athletes like Salman Khan, Rahul Dravid, Akshay Kumar, Farhan Akhtar, Kangana Ranaut, Suniel Shetty, Sonam K Ahuja, Arbaz Khan, Malaika Arora, Milind Soman, Sonika Kaliraman, Dharmendra, Sreesanth, Vivek Oberoi, Akshaye Khanna, Kajal Aggarwal, Mugdha Godse, and Shriya Saran. The Jaipur Marathon route is among the world's ten fastest courses.

Jaipur Marathon was recognized by the World Book of Records as the Largest Running Event in India in 2018 with 80,000 participants in various race categories. The race was also recognized by the Global Conference London as the Best Marathon of India in 2017. It is the only marathon in India where more than 15 world records were made in various categories since its inception.

Marathon details

Pre-race activity 
Two days before the race, a Bib Expo is organized where the runners can collect their running bibs and kit. The Expo carries a range of running-related products to assist runners.

Categories 
The event seven different race categories: marathon (42.195 km), half marathon (21.097 km), IIEMR (10 km), dream run (6 km), youth run (6 km), senior citizens' run (3 km), beti bojh nahi hai run (2 km), and wheel chair run (6 km).

The marathon starts from the South Gate of Ram Niwas Garden, Jaipur. It passes many of the city's iconic locations such as Albert Hall Museum, Kesargarh, Dolls Museum, Tri Murti Circle, Ravindra Manch, Birla Mandir, University of Rajasthan, Kulish Smriti Van, MNIT, World Trade Park, and Jawahar Circle.

Ambassadors 
The event ambassadors for the Jaipur Marathon have been:

 2010—Salman Khan
 2011—Salman Khan
 2012—Akshaye Khanna, Vivek Oberoi, Mugdha Godse, Shriya Saran 
 2013—Akshay Kumar, Rahul Dravid
 2014—Farhan Akhtar,
 2015—Arbaaz Khan, Malaika Arora Khan, Sonam Kapoor,
 2016—Suniel Shetty
 2017—Kangana Ranaut
The Maharaja of Jaipur H H Maharaja Sawai Padmanabh Singh is the Youth Ambassador of the Jaipur Marathon.

Winners 
Key:

Charity 
The Jaipur Marathon is one of India's largest charity platforms to raise funds for non-profit organizations. NGOs represent issues surrounding civic and community development, disability, education, environment and health, human rights, social services and women, children, and the aged. NGOs use this event as a platform to raise awareness for their work and to directly raise funds. Fundraising is facilitated by an easy-to-use model designed for all groups to raise funds. The Corporate Challenge is a category for companies who wish to sponsor employee teams to participate in events and raise funds. Fundraising is encouraged through donations and contributions received from friends, family, and colleagues in support of the charities and causes chosen by the participant.

Sponsors/partners

References

External links 
 

Marathons in India
Recurring sporting events established in 2010
Sport in Jaipur
Annual sporting events in India
2010 establishments in Rajasthan